The Bunker Tragedy was an atrocity committed by the staff at the Herzogenbusch concentration camp (also known as Kamp Vught) in the Netherlands, in January 1944 during World War II.

Events
When one woman from barrack 23B was locked up in the camp prison (the 'bunker'), other women protested against it. At the encouragement of Hermann Wicklein,  the commandant Adam Grünewald, as a punishment, had as many women as possible incarcerated in one cell. Eventually, 74 women were pressed together in cell 115, which had a floor area of 9m2 and hardly any ventilation. After 14 hours of confinement, the inmates were released from the cell. Ten women did not survive the night.

The incident soon became known outside the camp and was written about in resistance newspapers. The occupying power was not pleased with the fact that the news had leaked. Grünewald and Wicklein were both court-martialed for excessive cruelty. They were both convicted of manslaughter; Grünewald was sentenced to 3.5 years in prison and Wicklein was sentenced to six months in prison. They were both pardoned after serving a month in prison. However, Grünewald was then demoted and ordered to fight on the Eastern front, where he was killed in combat in January 1945.

, one of the bunker victims, wrote:
'When the lights went off, a great panic rose among the women. It was a strange swelling sound, which sometimes would diminish, but soon swell up again. It was caused by praying, screaming and yelling women. Some tried to yell over it to calm the women down, so they could save oxygen. Sometimes it would help a bit, but then it would start again. It would not stop, it continued the whole night. It diminished, though, because the heat was suffocating.'

This event is being remembered annually in closed circle.

See also
Black Hole of Calcutta
Nazi concentration camps

Sources and Notes

Nazi war crimes
Mass murder in 1944
The Holocaust in the Netherlands
Mass murder in the Netherlands
Massacres in 1944
War crimes in the Netherlands
January 1944 events
1944 in the Netherlands
Massacres of women
Violence against women in the Netherlands